Colby Community College (CCC) is a public community college in Colby, Kansas. It was established in 1964 and has a 57-acre main campus in Colby with an additional  agricultural center east of the city.

The college is able to accommodate hundreds of off-campus students by offering classes in the 14-county service area, including a nursing campus in Norton, and through online distance education courses.

Academics
Colby Community College offers more than 60 academic options which culminate in Associate of Arts, Science and Applied Science degrees as well as a variety of certifications, including technical certificates. Many of the programs and courses are offered in traditional and online learning environments.

Athletics

The Colby Trojans are members of the Kansas Jayhawk Community College Conference. All nine of the competitive athletic teams are Division I programs.

Notable alumni
 Jamie Adams - Basketball player, former professional basketball player, 2-Time All-MEAC, Boxtorow Third-Team All-American|https://www.stuff.co.nz/sport/basketball/77715766/canterbury-rams-american-jamie-adams-escapes-chicagos-mean-streets
 Daniel Cormier - NCAA runner-up, Olympic Wrestler, MMA fighter, UFC Light Heavyweight and UFC Heavyweight Champion.
  C.B. Dollaway - state champion wrestler; JUCO National Champion; NCAA D-1 All-American for ASU; professional mixed martial artist currently competing in the UFC's Middleweight Division
 Corey Hill - wrestler; former professional mixed martial arts fighter
 Mark Schultz -Contemporary Christian music artist.
 Brennan Ward, wrestler; professional mixed martial arts fighter

References

External links
 

Education in Thomas County, Kansas
Buildings and structures in Thomas County, Kansas
Community colleges in Kansas
Two-year colleges in the United States
NJCAA athletics